Augustin Keller (10 November 1805, in Sarmenstorf, Aargau – 8 January 1883) was a Swiss politician and a co-founder of the Christian Catholic Church of Switzerland, the Old Catholic Church in Switzerland. He is considered to have started the Monastery dispute of Aargau and was therefore responsible for the abolishment of all monasteries in Aargau in 1841.

After studying philology, history, pedagogy, philosophy and literature in Munich and Breslau, Keller first worked as a teacher in Lucerne and was the director of the teacher seminar of Aargau from 1834 to 1856. In this position earned a lot building up the education system in the canton of Aargau.

He was, however, better known as a radical liberal politician and harsh critic of the Roman Catholic Church, although he was himself a Catholic. In 1835 he was elected into the parliament of the canton of Aargau, which he was a part of until 1856. After conflicts resembling a civil war between government troops and Catholic insurgents in January 1841, Keller called the monasteries antagonistic to progress and made them accountable for the insurrection during a speech in parliament. Hereupon the government abolished all monasteries in Aargau. The Monastery dispute of Aargau caused an international crisis and ended in the Sonderbund war of 1847, which was followed by the founding of the Swiss federal republic in 1848.

From 1848 to 1881, Keller was politically active on a national level and was almost consistently a member of either the National Council or the Council of States. In 1871 and 1872 he was president of the latter. From 1856 to 1881, he was governmental council member of the canton Aargau. He spoke out for the complete equality for Jews.

As president of the Aargau church council, Keller denounced the dogma of infallibility of Pope Pius IX in 1870 and called for the establishment of an independent Swiss national church during the Kulturkampf. He was one of the founders of the Christkatholische Kirche, which is the Old Catholic Church in Switzerland and was elected president of the synod council in 1875.

Trivia
Augustin Keller was the grandfather of a major figure in the Fascist Frontsfrühling in Switzerland, Dr. Max Leo Keller.

References

External links

1805 births
1883 deaths
People from Bremgarten District
Swiss Old Catholics
Critics of the Catholic Church
Free Democratic Party of Switzerland politicians
Members of the Council of States (Switzerland)
Presidents of the Council of States (Switzerland)
Members of the National Council (Switzerland)
Presidents of the National Council (Switzerland)
19th-century Swiss politicians